The R770 or Noapara-Bagerhat-Pirojpur Highway is a transportation artery in Bangladesh, which connects National Highway N805 (at Katakhali) with Regional Highway R870 (at Pirojpur).

See also 
 N7 (Bangladesh)
 List of roads in Bangladesh

References 

Regional Highways in Bangladesh